Abu Hussain Sarkar (1894 – 17 April 1969) was a Bengali politician and lawyer. He served as the fourth chief minister of East Pakistan. Under his ministry, the Bangla Academy was inaugurated and 21 February was recognised as Shohid Dibosh in memory of the Bengali Language Movement.

Early life and education
Sarkar was born in 1894, to a Bengali Muslim family in Sadullapur, Gaibandha, which was then under the Rangpur District of the Bengal Presidency. He was involved in the Swadeshi movement, which disrupted his education and led to his arrest in 1911. He was later released and passed his matriculation in 1915. He then studied further, gaining a Bachelor of Law degree.

Career
Sarkar started his law practice in the Rangpur bar. He joined the Indian National Congress but left it over differences. In 1935, he joined A K Fazlul Huq's Krishak Praja Party. He contested in the 1937 Bengal legislative elections, winning in the Gaibandha North constituency. 

After the independence of Pakistan, Sarkar played an important role in the formation of Krishak Sramik Party in 1953. In 1953, he was elected to the East Bengal Provincial Assembly from the United Front. In 1955 he held the post of minister of health in the government of Chaudhry Muhammad Ali. In June 1955, Sarkar was elected the chief minister of East Bengal. His government made 21 February as Shohid Dibosh and a public holiday. He started the construction of Central Shaheed Minar. As chief minister he also inaugurated the Bangla Academy. He resigned on 30 August 1956 over inflation of food grains and subsequent food shortages.

From 1956 to 1958, Sarkar was the president of the Krishak Sramik Party and the leader of the opposition party. He played an important role in the formation of United Front led by Huseyn Shaheed Suhrawardy. He campaigned for the restoration of democracy in Pakistan.

Death
Sarkar died on 17 April 1969 in Dhaka in the then East Pakistan.

References

1894 births
1969 deaths
People of East Pakistan
Federal ministers of Pakistan
Bengali politicians
Krishak Sramik Party politicians
Date of birth missing
20th-century Bengalis
People from Gaibandha District
Bengal MLAs 1937–1945
Chief Ministers of East Pakistan